Mobile Jin (English: Mobile Genie) is a 2013 Pakistani children's fantasy television serial aired on PTV Home. The serial is directed by Gul Shah Bukhari and written by Riaz Sagar.

Mashhood Bin Shahzad is the hero of this drama.

 Riaz Sagar
 Ashraf Sulehri
 Aisha
 S. M Afzal
 Nighat Riaz
 Fiza Gill
 Gul Ahmed Gul
 Abas Malik
 Asad Khan Kakar
 Samroon
 Behroz
 Kanwal
 Ramzan
 Neelam

External links 
 on YouTube
  Mobile Jin on Facebook

External links 
 

Pakistan Television Corporation original programming
Pakistani children's television series
2013 Pakistani television series debuts
Urdu-language television shows
Pakistani fantasy
Pakistani speculative fiction television series